Peter Martin Boehm (February 10, 1845 – June 14, 1914) was an American soldier who fought in the American Civil War. Boehm received the country's highest award for bravery during combat, the Medal of Honor, for his action during the Battle of Dinwiddie Court House in Virginia on 31 March 1865. He was honored with the award on 15 December 1898.

Biography
Boehm was born in New York, and joined the Army in July 1858.  He served with the 2nd US Cavalry until transferring to the 15th New York. He was promoted to second lieutenant in the 15th New York Cavalry in March 1865. It was during this time that he performed the act of gallantry that would earn him the Medal of Honor. On 31 March 1865 Boehm, as aide-de-camp to General Custer, was involved in the Battle of Dinwiddie Court House in Virginia. On seeing a line of men being forced back by the enemy's assault, Boehm took the flag from the color bearer and mustered the line of men into action, eventually beating back the enemy's assault.

Boehm was also involved in the Indian Wars. He was breveted Captain on 27 February 1890 after displaying another act of bravery on the Brazos River in Texas in October of the previous year.

Boehm retired from active service in March 1878 and was presented with the Medal of Honor twenty years later. He died in 1914 and he was buried at Arlington National Cemetery, in Arlington, Virginia.

Medal of Honor citation

See also

 List of American Civil War Medal of Honor recipients: A–F

References

External links
 

1845 births
1914 deaths
People of New York (state) in the American Civil War
Union Army officers
United States Army Medal of Honor recipients
American Civil War recipients of the Medal of Honor
Burials at Arlington National Cemetery